"Dancing Lasha Tumbai" is a song recorded by Ukrainian singer Verka Serduchka (Andriy Danylko), written by Danylko himself. It is best known as the  entry at the Eurovision Song Contest 2007, held in Helsinki.

The original title was simply "Danzing", but it was changed due to a controversy about the lyrics. The song includes lyrics in four languages: German, English, Russian, and Ukrainian.

Eurovision

In the Eurovision Song Contest, "Dancing Lasha Tumbai" finished runner-up to 's "Molitva", sung by Marija Šerifović.

In the performance, Serduchka was accompanied by 5 back up singers and dancers, dressed in silver and gold clothing. Serduchka wore the number "69" on her back, with reference to the sexual position. The two main companion dancers either side of this wore the number "18", referring to the entry's position on the final, 18th to sing.

In the Eurovision Song Contest 2019 in Tel Aviv, Verka performed as part of the "Switch Song" interval act, alongside fellow drag queen and  winner Conchita Wurst,  winner Måns Zelmerlöw, and  runner-up Eleni Foureira. The latter performed a version of "Dancing Lasha Tumbai" where she wore an naked bodysuit with 250,000 crystals designed by Vrettos Vrettakοs, before Verka covered then-incumbent winner "Toy" by Netta.

Controversies
The choice of a drag performer as Ukraine's representative at ESC was fiercely criticized by several media and politicians of different parties in the country. Taras Chornovil of Party of Regions was quoted saying:

I guess some of our esteemed experts saw those "hot Finnish guys" dressed as monsters but didn't quite understand that there is subculture and there is pseudoculture. Those monsters are part of their subculture, which has the right to exist. But all these hermaphrodites have never been accepted anywhere. Therefore I think that this will be a serious embarrassment factor and the world will see us as complete idiots.

Another subject of controversy was song's title and lyrics. According to Danylko, the phrase Lasha tumbai is a Mongolian phrase for "whipped cream", "milkshake", or "churned butter". It was later alleged, though, that there are no such words in Mongolian and the catchphrase bears no meaning at all. There have been allegations that the words were chosen due to their phonetic resemblance to "Russia Goodbye", allegedly a reference to the 2004–2005 Orange Revolution. The song also contains a Russian-language phrase. Serduchka, however, had the full support of the National Television Company of Ukraine, and the participation in the contest in Helsinki went ahead as planned, with the song finishing 2nd in a field of 24, and becoming a major chart hit not only in Ukraine and neighbouring countries, but throughout the rest of Europe as well. At the Embrace Ukraine fundraiser, following the 2022 Russian invasion of Ukraine, Verka performed the song with the lyrics "I want to see Russia goodbye" and changed the song's title to "Dancing Russia Goodbye".

Use in popular culture
Danylko had a cameo as Serduchka in the 2015 film Spy, where he can be seen performing the song during a chase sequence involving lead actress Melissa McCarthy.

In 2020, the song was featured in the episode "Are You from Pinner?" of the BBC thriller series Killing Eve.

Charts

Track listing

CD single
All tracks are variations on the title track.

References

2007 singles
Eurovision songs of 2007
Eurovision songs of Ukraine
Macaronic songs
EMI Records singles
2007 songs
Pop-folk songs
Verka Serduchka songs